Salestan may refer to:
 Salestan, Astaneh-ye Ashrafiyeh
 Salestan, Rasht